Waghura is a village in Mundra Taluka of Kachchh District of Gujarat, India.

Notable people
Curumsey Damjee

External links 
 R.B. Curumsey Damjee of Waghora

Villages in Kutch district